Samuels v. McCurdy, 267 U.S. 188 (1925), was a United States Supreme Court case regarding the application of ex post facto in the case where an object was legally purchased and possessed, but was then later banned by statute.

Background 
In 1917, Georgia's prohibition law became effective prior to federal prohibition with the Eighteenth Amendment. Sig Samuels legally purchased alcohol for personal use prior to the ban which the DeKalb County Sheriff seized with a valid search warrant after the law became effective. Samuels sued for a return of his property for violating his due process. He also claimed the law was being applied in an ex post facto fashion because consumption per se was not forbidden by Georgia's law.

Opinion of the Court 
The court found that ex post facto does not apply, because possession is an ongoing condition.

See also 
 List of United States Supreme Court cases, volume 267

References

External links
 

1925 in United States case law
United States Constitution Article One case law
United States Supreme Court cases
United States Supreme Court cases of the Taft Court
Legal history of Georgia (U.S. state)
United States ex post facto case law
Prohibition in the United States
United States due process case law
DeKalb County, Georgia
United States Eighteenth Amendment case law